Rose Levy Beranbaum is an American baker, cookbook author and blogger.

She pioneered the reverse creaming technique of cake-making. In this process, the fat and flour are mixed first before adding the remaining ingredients. By coating the flour in fat, gluten development is inhibited, helping to prevent toughness. This is in contrast to the usual creaming technique, which first mixes fat and sugar.

Beranbaum has noted that she was heavily influenced by Julia Child and James Beard.

She has been married to Woody Wolston since 2021.

Bibliography
The Cake Bible (1988)
Rose's Christmas Cookies (1990)
Rose's Celebrations (1992)
Rose's Melting Pot: A Cooking Tour of America's Ethnic Celebrations (1994)
The Pie and Pastry Bible (1998)
The Bread Bible (2003)
Rose's Heavenly Cakes (2009)
The Baking Bible (2014)
Rose's Baking Basics (2018)
Rose's Ice Cream Bliss (2020)

Also
A Passion for Chocolate by Bernachon, Bernachon, Guarnaschelli, and Lee; Translated (1989)
What Do Women REALLY Want? Chocolate! by Donna L. Barstow; Foreword (2004)

References

External links
 Official Website

American food writers
Year of birth missing (living people)
Living people
20th-century American women writers
20th-century American non-fiction writers
21st-century American women writers
American women non-fiction writers
21st-century American non-fiction writers